Sławomir Stolc (born 23 January 1993) is a Polish volleyball player.

Sporting achievements

Clubs
 National championships
 2014/2015  Polish Cup, with LOTOS Trefl Gdańsk

References

External links
 Player profile at CEV.eu
 Player profile at PlusLiga.pl
 Player profile at WorldofVolley.com
 Player profile at Volleybox.net

1993 births
Living people
People from Kościerzyna
Polish men's volleyball players
Polish expatriate sportspeople in the Czech Republic
Expatriate volleyball players in the Czech Republic
Trefl Gdańsk players
ZAKSA Kędzierzyn-Koźle players
Effector Kielce players
AZS Częstochowa players
Stal Nysa players
LKPS Lublin players
GKS Katowice (volleyball) players